Remember Me This Way is a 1974 documentary film about the British glam rock star Gary Glitter.

Filmed the previous year, the documentary follows Glitter through a routine of press conferences, radio interviews, photo shoots, concert rehearsals, and so forth. It also includes Glitter's audition to star in an unproduced feature film.

The picture also documents the people working behind the scenes of Glitter's career. It shows them pressing copies of his records, and attending meetings where Bell Records staff discuss Glitter's record sales and arrangements for his concerts.

The movie follows Glitter and his entourage through to a sell-out concert at the Rainbow Theatre in London, and features songs from the show at the end, including a rendition of his song "I Love You Love Me Love".

This motion picture was a box office success at the time, and was later issued on VHS in the 1980s. A DVD release followed in 2005. The soundtrack album made #5 in 1974. A second DVD reissue was due on 24 October 2016.

External links

1974 films
British documentary films
Documentary films about singers
1974 documentary films
Gary Glitter
1970s English-language films
1970s British films